Sylvia Coleridge (10 December 1909 – 31 May 1986) was a British stage, film, radio and television actress. She was married to Albert George Fiddes-Watt and their daughter Kate, born 1943, is also an actress as Kate Coleridge.

Birth
Coleridge was born in Darjeeling, British India, now India.

Career
After her stage debut in 1931, her theatre work included appearances at The Old Vic, the Malvern Festival and with the Royal Shakespeare Company.

Her television acting credits include: Out of the Unknown, The Avengers, Paul Temple, The Lotus Eaters, Ace of Wands, The Tomorrow People, Z-Cars, Public Eye, Sutherland's Law, Dixon of Dock Green, The Onedin Line, Survivors, Armchair Thriller (in the serial Quiet as a Nun), Blake's 7 (in the episode Gambit as the Croupier), Shoestring, The Flipside of Dominick Hide, Angels, Funny Man, Rumpole of the Bailey, Artemis 81, Bleak House and the sitcom Maggie and Her.

Coleridge made a guest appearance in the Doctor Who serial The Seeds of Doom (1976). Tom Baker mentioned on the "Special Edition" DVD commentary for The Robots of Death that he had been so taken with Coleridge's eccentric performance in the serial that he had later suggested her as the new Doctor Who companion to producer Graham Williams.

Death
She died in London and was interred in the East London Cemetery.

Filmography

References

External links

Performances listed in the Theatre Archive University of Bristol

British stage actresses
British film actresses
British radio actresses
British television actresses
Sylvia
People from Darjeeling
Actresses from London
1909 births
1986 deaths
20th-century British actresses
20th-century English women
20th-century English people